"Ramaya" is a song by Mozambican recording artist Afric Simone in 1975, sung in Swahili.

Weekly charts

Year-end charts

See also
List of number-one hits of 1976 (Italy)

References

1975 singles
1975 songs
Number-one singles in Italy